George Ducker (September 27, 1871 – September 26, 1952) was a Canadian amateur soccer player who competed in the 1904 Summer Olympics. Ducker was born in Ontario, Canada. In 1904 he was member of the Galt F.C. team, which won the gold medal in the soccer tournament. He played all two matches as a defender.

References

External links

1871 births
1952 deaths
Canadian soccer players
Canadian people of German descent
Footballers at the 1904 Summer Olympics
Olympic gold medalists for Canada
Olympic soccer players of Canada
Soccer people from Ontario
Olympic medalists in football
Medalists at the 1904 Summer Olympics
Association football defenders